Gestão de Carreiras de Profissionais Desportivos, S.A., known as GestiFute, is a Portuguese company providing agent services for footballers. Unlike other football associations, Portugal allowed other parties to own part of the economic rights of the players, in order to receive part of the transfer fees. Its major stakeholder is Silva International Investments, currently headed by Riccardo Silva.

The company was founded by Jorge Mendes in 1996.

Players investment
GestiFute involved in numbers of high profile move in European transfer market, such as Cristiano Ronaldo. Before FIFA set up a new law restricting third party ownership (with "significant influence"), GestiFute was actively involved in third parties ownership. However, it in fact conflict of interests, as GestiFute was both the owner and the agent of the player. After 2008, GestiFute only received agent fees for the deals the company broke, and not actively in third parties ownership.  However a portion of the million transfer deal (such as 5%) was already half of, or even exceeded, the annual salary of the player.

2003-2006

On 9 March 2003, GestiFute announced that they represent Benfica's midfielder Tiago, who was previously represented by their rival company, Superfute. Approximately two months later, on 23 May, Tiago's teammate Ricardo Rocha traveled the same path, making a surprising move to GestiFute. During the summer of that year, on 29 July, Porto bought 20% of Deco's economic rights from GestiFute for €2.25 million, plus 5% of Paulo Ferreira and Ricardo Carvalho's economic rights, this price being higher than presumed because the Portuguese team refused a €15 million offer from Barcelona. On 4 April, the same team bought more 15% of Deco's economic rights for €1.25 million, plus 10% of striker Benni McCarthy's rights. After acquiring 35% rights, however, Porto still owned 85% rights before he was sold.

In 2004, some players represented by GestiFute were transferred for record prices, the first being Porto defender Paulo Ferreira, who joined Chelsea in a €20 million deal on 22 June. One month later, on 27 July, Ferreira's teammate Ricardo Carvalho also made a move to Chelsea, for a fee of €30 million. Deco was also later bought by Barcelona, but for less than Ferreira and Carvalho — Barcelona agreed on a €15 million fee in cash, in addition to the full rights of winger Ricardo Quaresma, who was valued at €6 million.

In 2005, on 14 June, GestiFute acquired a reported 70% of midfielder Anderson's economic rights for €5.5 million. Anderson, who was playing for Grêmio at the time, signed for the company after it was determined he would not feature for Grêmio again. Some days later, on 21 June, Porto bought Anderson, with GestiFute retaining a reported 20% of the Brazilian's rights with the club retaining 65% economic rights. Later that year, on 9 December, Tunisian midfielder Selim Benachour of Vitória de Guimarães also signed for GestiFute. On 1 December 2006, 18-year-old midfielder Fábio Coentrão joined GestiFute.

2007–2010
In 2007, GestiFute's Jorge Mendes was responsible for the transfers of Pepe, who joined Real Madrid from Porto for €30 million; Simão, who was transferred from Benfica to Atlético Madrid for €20 million; and Nani, who moved to Manchester United from Sporting CP after he dropped his previous agent, Ana Almeida. Also in that year, Anderson also moved to Manchester United in a €30 million deal, with previous club Porto paying Mendes a reported €3 million for his share of Anderson's registration.

In August 2010, football agent Gonçalo Reis complained that he had been left on the sidelines when Bébé, a player he represented, was transferred to Manchester United from Vitória de Guimarães. "When [Jorge] Mendes arrived," he said, "I was out of the transaction." Reis had arranged Bébé's move to Vitória from Estrela da Amadora in the Portuguese third division in July 2010 after the cancellation of his contract due to the club's inability to pay the player's wages. Manchester United signed Bébé for a reported fee of £7.4 million five weeks later. Then-United manager Sir Alex Ferguson admitted that he had not seen Bébé play. Gestifute apparently received 30% of the transfer fee for their part ownership of the player's economic rights. Vitória's directors reported that Mendes had received €3.6 million of the €9 million fee from the deal, with reports in Portugal suggesting that €2.7 million of that sum came from the 30% of the player's economic rights initially retained by Bébé but bought from the player by Mendes for €100,000.

In the summer of 2008, GestiFute also signed 15% economic rights of Pelé, as the latter was the piece-weigh of Internazionale to sign Ricardo Quaresma. Quaresma himself joined Inter for €18.6 million plus Pelé, was also represented by GestiFute. In June 2009, GestiFute signed Alexis Quintulen's 35% rights and Ignacio Ameli's 50% rights for €473,000.

In the same season Bébé left Portugal, GestiFute also broke the deal of Ángel Di María to Real Madrid for €25 million plus a €11 million bonus. Two year before, GestiFute purchased 33% of the player's economic rights from Benfica for €800 million, which Benfica the remain 70% earlier in August for €1 billion. GestiFute also signed the rights to receive 30% profit of selling Sidnei after deducted the residual contract value.

2011–
In August 2011, Porto sold striker Radamel Falcao for €40 million to Atlético Madrid. GestiFute and Orel B.V. received a total of €3.705 million agent fee (unknown ratio between the two company). GestiFute later (or before the deal) became the agent of the player. That season, GestiFute also represented Benfica's Fábio Coentrão in his €30 million deal to Real Madrid.

Football agents

Current
GestiFute provide agency services for the following players:

 Alan
 Albion Avdijaj
 Alípio
 Anderson
 Djavan Anderson
 André Geraldes
 André Gomes
 André Moreira
 André Silva
 Ansu Fati
 Bebé
 Bernardo Silva
 José Bosingwa
 Bruno Alves
 Bruno Gama
 Burgui
 Cândido Costa
 Cícero
 Cristiano Ronaldo
 Custódio
 Daniel Podence
 Danny
 David de Gea
 Ángel Di María
 Diego Costa
 Dinis Almeida
 Diogo Gonçalves
 Diogo Jota
 Diogo Salomão
 Artem Dzyuba
 Ederson
 Anwar El Ghazi
 Fábio Coentrão
 Fabinho
 Fábio Cardoso
 Radamel Falcao
 Facundo Ferreyra
 Faouzi Ghoulam
 Filipe Augusto
 Gabriel Paulista
 Gabrielzinho
 Ezequiel Garay
 Gil Dias
 Gonçalo Cardoso
 Gonçalo Guedes
 Okacha Hamzaoui
 Ahmed Hassan
 Hélder Costa
 Henrique Hilário
 Hugo Almeida
 Hugo Viana
 Ivan Cavaleiro
 João Cancelo
 João Carvalho
 João Gamboa
 João Moutinho
 João Teixeira
 Jorge Ribeiro
 José Sá
 Júlio Alves
 Pajtim Kasami
 Johannes Kreidl
 Manuel Fernandes
 Mário Sérgio
 Miguel Veloso
 Miranda
 Moreno
 Nani
 Nélson Oliveira
 Nélson Semedo
 Nicolás Otamendi
 Nuno Morais
 Paulo Ferreira
 Pedro Neto
 Pelé
 Pepe
 Pizzi
 Ricardo Quaresma
 Rafael Márquez
 Raul Meireles
 Renato Sanches
 Ricardo Carvalho
  Ricardo Carvalho (born 1996)
 Ricardo Pereira
 Roderick Miranda
 Rodrigo Fernandes
 Alberto Rodríguez
 James Rodríguez
 Rúben Dias
 Rúben Micael
 Rúben Neves
 Rúben Vezo
 Rui Patrício
   Sidnei
 Simão
 Thiago Silva
 Tiago
 Tiago Pinto
 Tiago Sá
 Ukra
 Mitchell van Rooijen
 Vítor Gomes
 Nikola Vukčević
 Wallace
 Walter Patrick
 Andi Zeqiri

Coach
 Abel Ferreira
 Bruno Lage
 Capucho
 Costinha
 José Mourinho
 Nuno Espírito Santo
 Paulo Fonseca
 Rui Faria

Former

References

External links
Official Site 

Association football organizations
Sports management companies
Service companies of Portugal